Thexton v Thexton is an important case in New Zealand trust law, applying the principle that burden of establishing an intention to create a trust rests on the person alleging it.

Background
The background of the case was a family dispute over the ownership of shares in a family business. The critical question before the court was whether the son held shares in trust for his father.

Judgment
Justice Salmon ruled, applying the principle of Herdegan v Federal Commissioner of Taxation 1988 84 ALR 271; "The burden of establishing that there was an intention to create a trust is on the person who alleges that a trust was created." Salmon J also held that inferring an intention does not require technical words and may come from a persons acts;

References

High Court of New Zealand cases
2000 in New Zealand law
2000 in case law
Wills and trusts
Equity (law)